Tiago Emanuel Jesus Morgado (born 28 July 1993) is a Portuguese professional footballer who plays for Real S.C. as a midfielder.

Club career
Born in Lisbon, Morgado played youth football with three local clubs, including Sporting CP from ages 12 to 16. He made his senior debut with Real SC, going on to represent them in three lower levels of Portuguese football.

In July 2016, Morgado moved straight to the Primeira Liga with Moreirense FC. He made his debut as a professional on 26 October at the age of 23, playing the full 90 minutes in a 1–0 home win against G.D. Estoril Praia in the second round of the Taça da Liga. He added a further two appearances in the competition, which was eventually won.

Morgado first appeared in the top division on 22 December 2016, coming on as a late substitute in a 2–1 away loss to S.C. Braga. In the summer of 2017 he rejoined his first club, recently promoted to the Segunda Liga.

Morgado scored his first goal as a professional on 3 September 2017, but the visitors lost 4–3 at Vitória de Guimarães B.

Honours
Moreirense
Taça da Liga: 2016–17

References

External links

Portuguese League profile 

1993 births
Living people
Portuguese footballers
Footballers from Lisbon
Association football midfielders
Primeira Liga players
Liga Portugal 2 players
Campeonato de Portugal (league) players
Real S.C. players
Moreirense F.C. players
Merelinense F.C. players
S.C. Covilhã players
F.C. Alverca players